Alberte Aveline (September 1939, in Constantine, Algeria – December 21, 2018, in Paris) was a French stage actress. She was a sociétaire of the Comédie-Française from 1966 to 2003.

References 

1939 births
2018 deaths
Pieds-Noirs
French actresses
French stage actresses
People from Constantine, Algeria